Neolamprologus mondabu is a species of cichlid endemic to Lake Tanganyika except for the southern portion where it is replaced by N. modestus.  It prefers areas with rocky substrates, moving to areas with sandy substrates to breed.  It feeds on the eggs of Lamprichthys tanganicanus. This species can reach a length of  TL.  This species can also be found in the aquarium trade.

Female Neolamprologus mondabu can dig pits in the bottom substrate to facilitate feeding of their offspring. Such maternal food provisioning is unusual and is not known among other African substrate-brooding cichlids, but similar behaviour has been observed in Central American cichlids.

References

mondabu
Fish of Lake Tanganyika
Fish of Burundi
Fish of the Democratic Republic of the Congo
Fish of Tanzania
Taxa named by George Albert Boulenger
Fish described in 1906
Taxonomy articles created by Polbot